Dron is a surname. Notable people with the surname include:

 Boris Dron (born 1988), Belgian racing cyclist
 Dumitru Dron (1893–1977), Moldovan politician
 Gaston Dron (1924–2008), French cyclist
 Murray Dron (born 1975), British journalist and TV presenter
 Petr Dron (born 1985), Russian curler
 Robert Wilson Dron (1869–1932), Scottish geologist and mining engineer
 Sever Dron (born 1944), Romanian tennis player and coach
 Tony Dron (1946–2021), British racing driver, author and journalist
 Alexander Dron Stewart (1883–1969), Scottish physician

See also
 Dron, an Indian village
 Dron & Dickson, a British business